Vanidah binti Imran (born 1 October 1973) better known by her stage name Vanidah Imran, is a Malaysian actress, model and television host.
In 2007, she received the  Best Female Actress award at 20th Malaysia Film Festival. She is mixed of Indian-Javanese descent.

She is formerly main host of TV3’s women magazine show Nona. The show is talking about women life, healthy lifestyles and family. She eventually became the main host of the show from 2 January 2011 took over Maya Karin.

Early life
Born in Penang to a Penangite Indian father and a Malay mother of Javanese descent who passed away when she was still a child, Vanidah grew up and spent her teenage years in Kuala Lumpur and completed her secondary education at Convent Bukit Nanas. Vanidah was the 1st Runner-Up of Miss World Malaysia 1993 and she also won the subsidiary title Miss Photogenic.

Personal life
She was married to a Malaysian actor named Rashidi Ishak on 1 October 2000, now both has divorced since 9 August 2018 after being married for 17 years with whom she had two children named Mikail Aimran (born 2002) and Maryam Rashika (born 2004). She obtained her English Studies degree after four years of studies at Open University Malaysia in 2015. She earned a Master's Degree in Performing Arts from University Malaya on March, 2022.
She was an active and performing member of Silat practitioner group named Seni Silat Cekak Pusaka Ustaz Hanafi Malaysia. She represented Malaysian team to perform the Malay traditional martial arts in Chungju World Martial Arts Masterships (WMC) 2019 in South Korea.

Filmography

Film

Television

Television series

Telemovie

Theater
Vanida also involved in theaters such as Megat Terawis (1994), Anak Tanjung (1995), Selendang Umi (1997), Laila Majnun (1998), Keris Sang Putri (1999), Tun Perak (2000), Lantai T. Pinkie (2000), Anugerah (2002) and Merdeka, Merdeka, Merdeka (2002). Her other theatre credits including Visits (2003), Moh Ho Huan (2005), Lantai T. Pinkie, KL (2006), Wangi Jadi Saksi (2006), Lantai T.Pinkie, Ipoh (2006), Nyonya (2007), Putra Merdeka (2007), Sirah Junjungan (2009), Mahsuri (2009), Cuci The Musical (2009) Baik Punya Cilok in 2015.

Awards and nominations

Malaysian Film Festival

Skrin Awards

References

External links
 

Malaysian actresses
People from Penang
Malaysian people of Malay descent
1973 births
Living people
Malaysian people of Indian descent
Malaysian people of Javanese descent
Malaysian Muslims